Rocky Mosley Jr. (born Roxell Mosley Jr., March 3, 1956 in Riverside, California) is a retired American professional boxer who fought out of Las Vegas, Nevada. Mosley was the NABF and USBA Junior Middleweight Champion. At his peak Mosley was ranked as the No. 4 Junior Middleweight in the world by the Ring magazine in 1981, until he lost his North American Championship to Rocky Fratto. Mosley's biggest wins were a knockout over former Olympic Bronze medalist Johnny Baldwin and a split-decision over Larry Bonds. Baldwin's only loss at the time was a 10 round decision loss to Marvelous Marvin Hagler.

Rocky Mosley was managed by professional poker player Billy Baxter. His trainer was the legendary Eddie Futch.

References 

1956 births
Living people
Boxers from California
People from Riverside, California
American male boxers
Light-middleweight boxers